Caloptilia hidakensis is a moth of the family Gracillariidae. It is known from the islands of Hokkaidō and Honshū in Japan and from the Russian Far East.

The wingspan is about 11 mm.

The larvae feed on Acer mono. They probably mine the leaves of their host plant.

References

hidakensis
Moths of Japan
Moths of Asia
Moths described in 1966